Dennis Joseph Dougherty (August 16, 1865 – May 31, 1951) was an American prelate of the Catholic Church. He served as Archbishop of Philadelphia from 1918 until his death in 1951, and was made a cardinal in 1921. He was Philadelphia's longest-serving archbishop and its first cardinal.

Early life and education
Dennis Dougherty was born on August 16, 1865 in the Homesville section of Butler Township in Schuylkill County, Pennsylvania. Nicknamed "Dinny" by his parents, he was the sixth of ten children of Patrick and Bridget (née Henry) Dougherty, who were natives of County Mayo, Ireland. The family lived in the Coal Region of Pennsylvania, with Dougherty's father working as a coal miner and Dougherty himself spending his summer vacations as a breaker boy in the mines.

As there was no Catholic church or parochial school in Homesville, the family worshiped at St. Joseph's Church in nearby Girardville and Dougherty attended public school there as well. At age 14, Dougherty applied to enter St. Charles Borromeo Seminary in Overbrook and even passed the entrance examination, but because of his young age, he was denied admission. On the advice of his pastor in Girardville, he enrolled at Collège Sainte-Marie in Montreal, where he studied under the Jesuits for two years.

In 1881, Dougherty applied to St. Charles Seminary again and was accepted, skipping the first two years of instruction. He remained at Overbook until 1885, when he was sent by Archbishop Patrick John Ryan to continue his studies at the Pontifical North American College in Rome. He was considered such an outstanding student that he was once waved away from an examination room by Professor Francesco Satolli, who told him, "Consider yourself examined." At the end of his studies in 1890, he received the degree of Doctor of Divinity.

Priesthood

While in Rome, Dougherty was ordained a priest on May 31, 1890 by Cardinal Lucido Parocchi at the Lateran Basilica. He celebrated his first Mass the next day at the altar of the Chair of Saint Peter at St. Peter's Basilica.

Upon his return to Philadelphia in the summer of 1890, Dougherty was appointed to the faculty of St. Charles Borromeo Seminary as a professor of Latin, English, and history. Over the next 13 years, he also taught Greek, French, and Hebrew before being promoted to the chair of dogmatic theology.

As a professor, Dougherty was known to be "a severe taskmaster" who lectured almost entirely in Latin. He also established a reputation as a scholar with his translation of the works of Orazio Marucchi and his publication of a series of articles on Anglican ordinations. He was invited to take the chair of dogmatic theology at the Catholic University of America, but Archbishop Ryan refused to let him leave Overbrook.

Bishop in the Philippines

Nueva Segovia
On April 7, 1903, Dougherty was notified of his appointment as Bishop of Nueva Segovia in the Philippines. The annexation of the heavily Catholic islands by the United States and the rejection of Philippine independence by the 1898 Treaty of Paris helped fuel the Philippine–American War, during which the Catholic priest Gregorio Aglipay broke with Rome and founded the nationalist Philippine Independent Church. After the war ended with an American victory in 1902, Pope Leo XIII appointed four American bishops to Philippine dioceses, including Dougherty.

Dougherty received his episcopal consecration on June 14, 1903 from Cardinal Francesco Satolli (his former professor), with Cardinal Pietro Gasparri and Archbishop Enrico Grazioli serving as co-consecrators, at the church of Santi Giovanni e Paolo al Celio in Rome. He then returned to Philadelphia and recruited five priests to join him in the Philippines, including Daniel James Gercke and John Bernard MacGinley. The bishop and his priests left Philadelphia on August 24 and arrived at the diocesan seat in Vigan on October 22.

War had left many Catholic institutions in a state of disrepair, and several church properties were under the control of Aglipay and his supporters, including the Vigan Cathedral. Dougherty's arrival was not welcomed by the Filipinos who wanted a native clergy; in September 1904, Bishop Thomas Augustine Hendrick mentioned to President Theodore Roosevelt that "three attempts have been made to murder Bishop Dougherty of Vigan..." Dougherty managed to recover church property by forcing Aglipay to unsuccessfully prove ownership in court, and he made house-to-house visits in Vigan to collect funds to repair the cathedral.

The diocesan seminary, which had been occupied by American troops during the war, was reopened in June 1904 and staffed by the Jesuits. A girls' academy was also reopened under the care of the Sisters of Saint Paul of Chartres, who established a second academy in Tuguegarao. Dougherty toured the diocese on horseback and by canoe, confirming as many as 70,000 children at a time.

Jaro
Following the death of Bishop Frederick Z. Rooker, Dougherty was appointed to succeed him as Bishop of Jaro on June 21, 1908. His new diocese had a Catholic population of 1.3 million but only half of the 151 churches had resident pastors. During his tenure in Jaro, Dougherty managed to find pastors for 41 churches while also establishing six new parishes and converting 12 missions into parishes. He opened a hospital staffed by the Sisters of Saint Paul of Chartres, who had worked with him in Nueva Segovia. To combat the efforts of Protestant missionaries in the Philippines, Dougherty operated a movie theater where the price of admission was a Protestant Bible.

After San Francisco's auxiliary bishop Denis J. O'Connell was made Bishop of Richmond in 1912, Archbishop Patrick William Riordan sought a coadjutor bishop and his first choice was Dougherty, whom he had met when Dougherty stopped in San Francisco en route to the Philippines for the first time. Dougherty expressed his willingness to accept the post in San Francisco, but the move was vetoed by Cardinal Rafael Merry del Val, believing Dougherty was needed more in the Philippines.

Bishop of Buffalo
After 12 years in the Philippines, Dougherty's health was beginning to fail and he requested to return to the United States in 1915. Bishop Charles H. Colton of the Diocese of Buffalo died in May that year, followed by Archbishop James Edward Quigley of the Archdiocese of Chicago in July. Dougherty was initially slated for Chicago while Auxiliary Bishop George Mundelein of Brooklyn was slated for Buffalo. However, when rumors of Rome's intentions reached the British government, it reportedly objected to having a German bishop like Mundelein so close to the Canadian border during World War I. The appointments were switched and Dougherty was named Bishop of Buffalo on December 9, 1915.

Dougherty formally took charge of his new diocese on June 7, 1916, when he was installed at St. Joseph Cathedral. At the time of Dougherty's arrival, the diocese was burdened with a debt of $1.6 million from the construction of the new cathedral. Dougherty almost completely eliminated that debt by taxing the diocese's parishes according to their means. During his tenure, he also established 15 new parishes and supported the war effort through liberty bond campaigns and Red Cross drives.

Archbishop of Philadelphia
Following the death of Archbishop Edmond Francis Prendergast, Dougherty was appointed Archbishop of Philadelphia by Pope Benedict XV on May 1, 1918. Upon his homecoming, he was installed on July 10, 1918 at the Cathedral of Saints Peter and Paul, in a ceremony presided over by Cardinal James Gibbons.

Similar to his time as a seminary professor, Dougherty was known as the "strictest disciplinarian...[who] rules his clergy with an iron hand, insists on punctuality, obedience, deference." He was also known as "God's Bricklayer" for his massive expansion of the archdiocese. During his 33-year tenure in Philadelphia, the number of Catholics in the archdiocese increased from approximately 710,000 to 1,031,866; priests from 779 to 1,910; religious sisters from 3,884 to 6,819; churches from 327 to 397; hospitals from six to 18; parochial schools from 180 to 325; high schools from three to 56; and colleges from three to seven. Among the colleges founded during his tenure were Immaculata University (1920), Rosemont College (1921), Chestnut Hill College (1924), and Gwynedd Mercy University (1948).

1918 influenza pandemic
Very early into Dougherty's tenure as archbishop, the 1918 influenza pandemic struck Philadelphia. More than 17,500 Philadelphians died in the first six months of the pandemic, with a single-day high of 837. The Philadelphia Liberty Loans Parade, held nearly three months after Dougherty's arrival, resulted in 12,000 deaths alone.

Dougherty authorized the use of church facilities as temporary hospitals. Many nuns worked as nurses and Dougherty asked for volunteer gravediggers among the students at St. Charles Seminary. In compliance with the state Board of Health's order in October 1918, Dougherty closed all churches and schools to public gatherings. When the pandemic subsided, Mayor Thomas B. Smith expressed his gratitude to Dougherty by saying, "I look upon the services rendered by the Archbishop and the nuns as one of the most potent aids in making the headway we have toward getting control of the epidemic."

Cardinal
On February 13, 1921, it was announced that Pope Benedict XV would elevate Dougherty to the College of Cardinals. He was created Cardinal-Priest of Santi Nereo e Achilleo in the consistory of March 7, 1921. He was the first Archbishop of Philadelphia to serve as a cardinal, beginning a tradition that would last for 90 years. As a cardinal, Dougherty served as a member of the congregations for Discipline of the Sacraments, Rites, Propagation of the Faith, and Oriental Churches.

Dougherty was unable to participate in the first papal conclave following his elevation. He was touring the West Indies when Benedict XV died on January 22, 1922. After briefly returning to Philadelphia, he departed from New York with Cardinal Louis-Nazaire Bégin of Quebec on January 28 but noted that he did not expect to arrive in time for the conclave, which was scheduled to begin on February 2. Their ship was delayed by severe storms, and they received news of the election of Pope Pius XI while at sea. Cardinal William Henry O'Connell of Boston also missed the conclave, leaving no American electors. After arriving in Rome on February 9, Dougherty had a private audience with the new pope, who had relatives living in Bloomsburg, Pennsylvania. Dougherty was able to participate in the 1939 conclave that elected Pope Pius XII.

Catholic education
Dougherty, whose entire time as a priest was spent in teaching, was insistent on the establishment of a parochial school at every parish. He frequently threatened to suspend priests who were unwilling to follow this directive, believing, "A parochial school is a necessity, especially in this country where our children breathe in an atmosphere of hersey, unbelief, and sometimes irreligion...Priests and parents are bound to provide a religious education for children."

In an address to the graduating class of Villanova University in June 1921, Dougherty denounced plans for a federal Department of Education, saying, "We give notice that we will never permit our Catholic schools to be controlled by a clique of politicians in Washington."

Ethnic groups
To offset the intensifying efforts of Protestant evangelization among Italian Philadelphians, Dougherty introduced Italian classes at St. Charles Borromeo Seminary and placed priests who had studied in Rome at Italian churches. However, he also discouraged Italian religious festivals like the Feast of San Gennaro, which were popular elsewhere in the country, to encourage assimilation. Tensions between Dougherty and the Italian Catholic community reached a high point in 1933, when the cardinal's plan to close the Italian-speaking parish of Our Lady of Good Counsel in South Philadelphia sparked a riot. On the eve of the parish's closure, thousands of parishioners occupied the church and even held a priest hostage for five months. The congregation took the case to the Supreme Court of Pennsylvania but lost, and Dougherty finally closed the church in 1937.

From 1921 until his death in 1951, Dougherty served as president of the Commission for the Catholic Missions among the Colored People and the Indians. He encouraged the work of Mother (now Saint) Katharine Drexel among Native Americans and African Americans, and once wrote, "Perhaps the greatest problem confronting the nation is that of the colored race, who were brought here as slaves and have been abandoned to their fate." In 1923, he declared that elementary school admissions would be based on parish residence, regardless of race, ending a policy of sending Black children to schools in predominantly Black parishes. The following year he established Holy Savior Church (now St. Ignatius) in West Philadelphia, where the Sisters of the Blessed Sacrament also opened a convent in 1925. Holy Redeemer Church for Chinese Catholics was opened in 1941 and visited by Cardinal Thomas Tien Ken-sin in 1946.

Movie theater ban
In May 1934, Dougherty forbid Catholics in the Archdiocese of Philadelphia from entering movie theaters, declaring that the film industry's focus on "sex and crime" was a "vicious and insidious attack...on the very foundations of our Christian civilization." He added: "The only argument likely to be heard now is that which affects the box office." As a result, ticket sales soon plummeted by 20-40 percent.

Due to the decrease in revenue, many studio executives and other public figures begged Dougherty to end the boycott, including Samuel Goldwyn and John B. Kelly Sr. He twice refused to arrange a meeting with Harry Warner. While Dougherty never revoked the ban, Catholics gradually returned to theaters. In June 1934, one Philadelphia Catholic, Joseph Breen, was appointed to head the newly created Production Code Administration and apply the Hays Code to film production.

Handling of sexual abuse cases

According to an official history of the Archdiocese of Philadelphia, Dougherty "reserved the appointment of pastors to himself." A 2005 grand jury report included at least two priests during Dougherty's tenure (1918-1951) who were accused of sexual abuse and transferred to other parishes:

Rev. Gerard W. Chambers was accused of molesting numerous altar boys during his 40 years as a priest in the Archdiocese of Philadelphia, and was transferred to 11 different parishes under Dougherty's tenure between 1934 and 1949.

Rev. Joseph P. Gausch wrote letters to another priest detailing his abuse of young boys, which were brought to Dougherty's attention in 1948. After being sent to a hospital in Wisconsin to do "penance," Gausch was assigned to St. Anthony of Padua Parish in Easton in 1949.

Later life and death
During the 1948 presidential election, Dougherty gave the invocation at the Republican National Convention and later the Democratic National Convention, both of which were held in Philadelphia that year. In February 1949, he held his first press conference since becoming a cardinal in 1921 to denounce the treatment of Cardinal József Mindszenty, whose trial in Hungary he labeled a "mockery of justice."

On the morning of May 31, 1951, shortly after celebrating a private Mass marking the 61st anniversary of his priestly ordination, Dougherty died from a stroke at his residence. His funeral Mass was celebrated by Bishop J. Carroll McCormick, Dougherty's nephew and an auxiliary bishop of Philadelphia. He is buried in the crypt of the Cathedral Basilica of Saints Peter and Paul.

Cardinal Dougherty High School in Philadelphia is named in his honor.

References

Sources
 
 
 

1865 births
1951 deaths
20th-century American cardinals
American Roman Catholic clergy of Irish descent
Pontifical Urban University alumni
Pontifical North American College alumni
Roman Catholic archbishops of Philadelphia
Burials at the Cathedral Basilica of Saints Peter and Paul (Philadelphia)
People from Ashland, Pennsylvania
Roman Catholic bishops of Buffalo
Roman Catholic bishops of Nueva Segovia
Roman Catholic bishops of Jaro